Catherine Anne Bosworth (born January 2, 1983) is an American actress. Following minor roles in the films The Horse Whisperer (1998) and Remember the Titans (2000), she rose to prominence with her role as a young surfer in the box-office hit Blue Crush (2002).

She also had roles in independent films, playing Dawn Schiller in the true crime film Wonderland (2003) and Sandra Dee in the Bobby Darin biographical drama Beyond the Sea (2004). She portrayed Lois Lane in Superman Returns (2006), and had roles in 21 (2008), Straw Dogs (2011), And While We Were Here (2012), and Still Alice (2014). She starred in the horror films Before I Wake (2016) and The Domestics (2018). Recently, she starred as KC in the Netflix science fiction miniseries The I-Land (2019).

Early life 
Bosworth was born in Los Angeles, California, and spent her early childhood in San Francisco, California, the only child of Patricia (née Potter), a homemaker, and Harold Bosworth, a former executive for Talbots. She was born with heterochromia iridum, and has a hazel right eye and a blue left eye. When she was six years old, her family relocated from San Francisco to various parts of the country due to her father's job. She was raised mainly on the East Coast, spending the rest of her youth in Massachusetts and Connecticut.

Bosworth developed an interest in equestrian sports, specifically stadium jumping, and by age 14 was a champion equestrian. She graduated from Cohasset High School in Cohasset, Massachusetts in 2001.

Career

Early work 
Bosworth's first film role came after an open casting call in New York for the supporting part of Judith in the 1998 film The Horse Whisperer. The producers needed someone who was an experienced horse rider, and Bosworth won the role. The film got a positive reception from film critics. In 2000, she starred in the television series drama Young Americans as Bella Banks, but it was canceled. That year she had a small part in the film Remember the Titans. In 2001, she moved to Los Angeles to seek better film parts.

Initial success 

Bosworth's breakthrough role came in the 2002 surfing movie Blue Crush. She prepared for the role by working with two trainers seven hours a day for months, adding 15 pounds of muscle to her frame. In his review of the film, Rolling Stone's Peter Travers wrote: "Bosworth is a star in the making, but even she can't outshine the surfing footage, which is flat-out spectacular." The film received positive reviews and grossed $40 million at the United States box office. Bosworth then took on the lead role in the low-budget Wonderland (2003) opposite Val Kilmer. She played the teenage girlfriend of porn star John Holmes.

In 2004, she played the lead role in romantic comedy Win a Date with Tad Hamilton!, opposite Topher Grace. It was critically and financially unsuccessful. Also in 2004, she portrayed actress Sandra Dee in Beyond the Sea. Reviews were mixed, and it was a box office failure, though Bosworth's performance received critical acclaim. The next year, she portrayed Chali, a Hare Krishna, in the film adaptation of Myla Goldberg's novel Bee Season (2005), about a dysfunctional Jewish family.

Late 2000s 

Bosworth was cast as reporter Lois Lane in Bryan Singer's film Superman Returns (2006), which also starred her Beyond the Sea co-star Kevin Spacey as Lex Luthor, and newcomer Brandon Routh as Superman. It was a box office success and received mostly positive reviews. Bosworth's performance however, was not well received; Anthony Lane of The New Yorker wrote: "The new Lois Lane, Kate Bosworth, is not a patch on Margot Kidder, or, for that matter, on Teri Hatcher, in the TV series." San Francisco Chronicle film critic Mick LaSalle felt that Bosworth, at age 22, was too young to portray Lane, and that the climax did not "match the potential of the tiring 154 minute long film". Although Bosworth's performance was ambivalently received, she loved working on the movie. As she told Teen Vogue in August 2006, "You know how you have an experience, a time in your life when you feel you've come into your own? When you grow up a bit, and think, Now I get it? [...] That's how I feel. I feel a little bit more complete." She was eventually nominated for worst supporting actress at the Razzie Awards for the part. The movie grossed $52 million on its opening weekend in North America and went on to earn $391 million worldwide.

Bosworth starred as Louise in the psychological drama The Girl in the Park with Sigourney Weaver, Alessandro Nivola and Keri Russell, written and directed by Pulitzer Prize winner David Auburn in his directorial debut. It premiered at the 2007 Toronto International Film Festival, and was subsequently picked up by The Weinstein Company. Alissa Simon of Variety wrote that Bosworth "tries her best, but her character's too extremely drawn." Bosworth also filmed 21, an adaptation of the book Bringing Down the House, in early 2007 in Boston, Massachusetts and Las Vegas, Nevada, reuniting with co-star Kevin Spacey and director Robert Luketic. It garnered mixed reviews, with Joanne Kaufman of the Wall Street Journal concluding, "Very little adds up in 21."

In 2006, she optioned the film rights to Catherine Hanrahan's novel Lost Girls and Love Hotels and was set to produce the project with filmmaker Nadia Connors. As of 2016, the project was at a standstill. In 2010, she starred in The Warrior's Way, shot in New Zealand with Korean actor Jang Dong-gun and Geoffrey Rush. It was one of 2010's biggest box-office flops, grossing only slightly more than $11,000,000 worldwide against its $42 million budget. Bosworth has said about her roles, "I just don't do comfort zones."

In January 2008, Bosworth was named the new face of Calvin Klein Jeans and appeared in their ad  campaigns. She also became the spokesperson for the American luxury bag brand Coach in Asia.

2010s: Fashion and acting 
In 2011, Bosworth contracted to sing the television jingle for Cotton Incorporated's "Fabric of My Life" advertisement. On December 4, 2012, Topshop revealed that she was the "secret" woman in the new Topshop Christmas Adverts.

Bosworth designed a jewelry line with friend and celebrity stylist Cher Coulter called JewelMint, which launched in October 2010. The first vertical venture of MySpace co-founder Josh Berman and Diego Berdakin's social commerce company, BeachMint features designs by Coulter and Bosworth.

In 2012 Bosworth was the face of skincare brand SK-II.

She appeared in ten films between 2011 and 2014, moving away from the big-budget Superman franchise into lower-budget film roles like Still Alice with Julianne Moore. The short film Lov, filmed in Slovenia, featured her and launched fashion designer Vanessa Bruno’s Fall 2011 campaign.

In 2013, Bosworth was cast in the horror film Before I Wake  directed by Mike Flanagan; it was released on Netflix in 2017.

In she was cast in the post-apocalyptic horror film The Domestics released on June 28, 2018.

In September 2018, it was announced that Bosworth would have the main role of KC on the Netflix science-fiction miniseries The I-Land. It was released on September 12, 2019. That year, she was cast in the sci-fi thriller Genesis.

Activism and honors 
In 2018, Bosworth was included in People magazine's list of 25 Women Changing the World. In late 2018, she and husband Michael Polish debuted their privately funded film Nona, which focuses on the issues of human trafficking. She works closely with CAST, the Coalition to Abolish Slavery and Trafficking.

In 2018, Bosworth and Polish opened the Montana Institute of the Arts, a summer school for filmmaking students.

Personal life 
Bosworth was accepted to Princeton University in late 2000, but because of continual deferral of her attendance, her acceptance was revoked. She is a member of the Appalachia Service Project.

She had a relationship with actor Orlando Bloom from 2002 to 2005.

In mid-2011, she began dating American director Michael Polish, whom she met earlier that year when he directed her in Big Sur. They announced their engagement in August 2012, and married on August 31, 2013, in Philipsburg, Montana. In August 2021 she announced her separation from Polish. Bosworth is the stepmother to Jasper, Polish's daughter from a previous marriage, whom Bosworth said was “hands-down the greatest unexpected gift of her life”.

She is a member of Soka Gakkai International, an organization of Nichiren Buddhism and Mahayana Buddhism. She enjoys running and Pilates, and practices meditation.

Because Bosworths' grandparents suffered from Alzheimer's disease, the book Still Alice affected her. She contacted the author, Lisa Genova, and later secured a co-starring role in the film version.

As of January 1, 2022, it was reported that Bosworth was in a relationship with actor Justin Long.

Filmography

Film

Television

Video games

References

External links 

 
 

1983 births
20th-century American actresses
21st-century American actresses
21st-century Buddhists
21st-century American singers
Actresses from Connecticut
Actresses from Los Angeles
Actresses from Massachusetts
American Buddhists
American child actresses
American female equestrians
American film actresses
American television actresses
Cohasset High School alumni
Converts to Sōka Gakkai
Living people
Members of Sōka Gakkai
Nichiren Buddhists
People from Cohasset, Massachusetts
People from Darien, Connecticut
Singers from Massachusetts